James Scudamore (born 19 May 1976) is a British author.

Books
Scudamore's first novel The Amnesia Clinic won the 2007 Somerset Maugham Award and was shortlisted for the Costa First Novel Award, the Commonwealth Writers' Prize, the Glen Dimplex Award and the Dylan Thomas Prize. It was described by Hilary Mantel as "A wonderful debut – witty, polished, fluent and effortlessly entertaining" and by the judges of the Costa Award  as a "delightful book ... full of tall tales and fantasy".

His second novel, Heliopolis, was published in 2009. Writing in The Guardian, Henry Shukman commented that "In his second novel, set in contemporary São Paulo, Scudamore does not embed a transplant from his own culture in foreign soil. Instead he takes the plunge and boldly invests himself in a first-person narrator. The novel is cleverly pitched to explore the two socioeconomic poles of modern urban Brazil. And the writing is exemplary: you feel the hand of a natural at work, one whose command of tone is strong, and who has an instinctive feel for handling a story." The novel was longlisted for the 2009 Man Booker Prize.

Following the publication in 2013 of his third novel, Wreaking, the BBC Today programme interviewed Scudamore inside the grounds of the derelict Severalls Hospital in Colchester, where he explained how visits to such sites, rendered defunct by the Care in the Community Act, had directly inspired the book. The novelist Alan Warner described Wreaking as "an immersion in the physical and psychic ruins of a contemporary Britain which enchants and disturbs, lures and repels".

English Monsters is Scudamore's fourth novel and was published in 2020. It depicts the effects of physical and sexual abuse at a boarding prep school on a group of friends over a thirty-year period. Edward Docx wrote of this "dark, tender, troubling novel" that "it is impossible to read these pages and not to think of the present blight of emotionally cauterised boarding-school politicians whose various pathologies, fantasies and defence mechanisms Britain must continue to endure."

Biography
Scudamore grew up in Japan, Brazil and the UK, and is a graduate of Christ Church, Oxford and of the University of East Anglia. He is married to Rose Grimond, the granddaughter of the Liberal politician Jo Grimond. He has taught at the University of East Anglia and the City University of Hong Kong and is on the faculty of the International MFA in Creative Writing and Literary Translation at Vermont College of Fine Arts.

External links
 Author website
 Today programme audio slideshow
 Author interview on Man Booker website
 Author interview at nthWORD Magazine
 Author interview with Michael Leonard

Footnotes 

1976 births
Living people
Alumni of Christ Church, Oxford
Alumni of the University of East Anglia
British writers